Thomas Weston (1737–1776) was an English actor, outstanding comedian and notable scrub.

Life
Weston was the son of a cook. He made his first London appearance in about 1759, and from 1763 until his death, he was considered to be the most amusing comedian on the English stage.

Weston was considered as “Foote’s most faithful trouper and a gifted comedian. Samuel Foote wrote for him the part of Jerry Sneak in The Mayor of Garratt. Abel Drugger in the Alchemist was one of his famous performances; and Garrick, who also played this part, praised him highly for it. Georg Christoph Lichtenberg describes the craft and expertise skills of Weston’s playing of comic ‘business’ as scrub.

He was in debt and so much addicted to liquor. He destroyed his inside by frequent intoxication. He died on 18 January 1776.

References

1737 births
1776 deaths
English male stage actors
18th-century English male actors